Lubavitch Senior Girls' School is a Jewish secondary school and sixth form for girls, located in the Stamford Hill area of the London Borough of Hackney in England. The schools is guided by the principles of the Chabad-Lubavitch movement.

First opened as a private school in 1962, Lubavitch Senior Girls' School became a voluntary aided school in 2012 under the control of Hackney London Borough Council. In April 2018 Lubavitch Senior Girls' School converted to academy status and is now sponsored by The Lubavitch Multi Academy Trust.

Lubavitch Senior Girls' School offers GCSEs as programmes of study for pupils, while students in the sixth form have the option to study from a range of A Levels. The curriculum of the school is divided between secular subjects (Chol) and religious studies (Kodesh). Secular subjects include Modern Hebrew, while religious studies include the Yiddish language and Jewish history.

References

External links
 Lubavitch Senior Girls' School official website

Chabad in Europe
Haredi Judaism in the United Kingdom
Secondary schools in the London Borough of Hackney
Jewish schools in England
Chabad schools
Girls' schools in London
Educational institutions established in 1962
1962 establishments in England
Orthodox Jewish educational institutions
Orthodox Judaism in London
Academies in the London Borough of Hackney
Stamford Hill